The 1941 Washington Senators won 70 games, lost 84, and finished in sixth place in the American League. They were managed by Bucky Harris and played home games at Griffith Stadium.

Offseason 
 Prior to 1941 season: Sonny Dixon was signed by the Senators as an amateur free agent.

Regular season

Season standings

Record vs. opponents

Roster

Player stats

Batting

Starters by position 
Note: Pos = Position; G = Games played; AB = At bats; H = Hits; Avg. = Batting average; HR = Home runs; RBI = Runs batted in

Other batters 
Note: G = Games played; AB = At bats; H = Hits; Avg. = Batting average; HR = Home runs; RBI = Runs batted in

Pitching

Starting pitchers 
Note: G = Games pitched; IP = Innings pitched; W = Wins; L = Losses; ERA = Earned run average; SO = Strikeouts

Other pitchers 
Note: G = Games pitched; IP = Innings pitched; W = Wins; L = Losses; ERA = Earned run average; SO = Strikeouts

Relief pitchers 
Note: G = Games pitched; W = Wins; L = Losses; SV = Saves; ERA = Earned run average; SO = Strikeouts

Farm system 

LEAGUE CHAMPIONS: Thomasville

Notes

References 
1941 Washington Senators at Baseball-Reference
1941 Washington Senators team page at www.baseball-almanac.com

Minnesota Twins seasons
Washington Senators season
Washington